Dasavatharam is a 1976 Indian Tamil-language Hindu mythological film, directed and written by K. S. Gopalakrishnan. The film, based on the Dashavatara (ten Avatars) of Vishnu, stars Ravikumar, with Sirkazhi Govindarajan, Jayachitra, Gemini Ganesan, M. R. Radha, P. S. Veerappa, Sowcar Janaki and K. R. Vijaya in supporting roles. It was released on 15 January 1976.

Plot 

Dasavatharam tells the "Ten Avatars", a spell–binding story about how far you can get with Lord Vishnu's grace. The Ten avatars named are as follows: Matsya (The Fish), Kurma (The Tortoise), Varaha (The Boar), Narasimha (The halfman/half lion), Vamana (a Dwarf), Parashurama (Warrior with the Axe), Rama (Prince of Ayodhya), Krishna (Prince of Mathura), Balarama (Avatar of Adhisheshan) and Kalki (Eternity).

Cast 
 Ravikumar as Lord Vishnu
 Jayachitra as Mahalakshmi
 Sirkazhi Govindarajan as Naradha
Gemini Ganesan as Prince Arjuna
P. S. Veerappa as Prince Dhuchadhanan
K. R. Vijaya as Yasodhai
M. R. Radha as Hiranyakashipu
M. R. R. Vasu as Hayagriva
 S. Varalakshmi as Goddess Adhiparasakthi
 Udaiyappa as Lord Shiva
P. R. Varalakshmi as Parvati
V. Gopalakrishnan as Lord Brahma
 Udaya Chandrika as Goddess Saraswathi
 Vijayageetha as Mahasaraswati
 Sowcar Janaki as Leelavathi
 Baby Rani as Prahalad
 V. S. Raghavan as Guru Sukracharya
 Kaka Radhakrishnan as Sukracharya's Assistant
 Y. G. Mahendran as a Tribe
 S. V. Sahasranamam as King Mahabali
 Shanmugasundaram as Prince Namachi, Mahabali's Son
 Master Raghuraman as Vamana
 Major Sundarrajan as King Dasharatha
 C. R. Vijayakumari as Queen Kaikeyee
 Master Sridhar as Prince Lakshmana
 Master Sekhar as Prince Bharatha
 Sridevi as Princess Sita
 Sripriya as Shurpanakha
 S. A. Ashokan as King Ilangeswaran or Ravanan
 V. K. Ramasamy as Ilangeswaran's Minister
 Thengai Srinivasan as Jamadagni
 V. R. Thilagam as Renuka Devi
A. K. Veerasami as Sage Durvasa
 S. V. Ramadas as Prince Duryodhana
 Jaya as Princess Draupadi/Panchaali
Indhra devi as Thazhambu

Soundtrack 
Music was by S. Rajeswara Rao and lyrics were written by Udumalai Narayana Kavi, A. Maruthakasi and Vaali.

Reception
Kanthan of Kalki called Seerkazhi Govindarajan as a main hero of the film for making audience understand about ten incarnations while also praising the actors, cinematography and graphics but felt the film was lengthy due to too many songs and lengthy dialogues which affected the film's pace.

References

External links 
 

1970s Tamil-language films
1976 films
Films about Hinduism
Films about reincarnation
Films about royalty
Films about shapeshifting
Films based on the Mahabharata
Films based on the Ramayana
Films directed by K. S. Gopalakrishnan
Films scored by S. Rajeswara Rao
Films with screenplays by K. S. Gopalakrishnan
Hindu devotional films
Hindu mythological films
Indian epic films
Indian musical films
Indian nonlinear narrative films
Krishna in popular culture
Religious epic films